2002 Ventforet Kofu season

Competitions

League table

Domestic results

J. League 2

Emperor's Cup

Player statistics

Other pages
 J. League official site

Ventforet Kofu
Ventforet Kofu seasons